Colfax Township is a township in Page County, Iowa, USA.

History
It is named for Schuyler Colfax.

References

Townships in Page County, Iowa
Townships in Iowa